Lera Lynn (born December 5, 1984) is an American singer, songwriter, musician, and actress.

Early life
Born in Houston, Texas, Lynn was raised in Georgia. She has a bachelor's degree in anthropology from the University of Georgia. Before attending the university, she briefly attended Young Harris College in Young Harris, Georgia.

Career
Lynn's first LP, Have You Met Lera Lynn, was released in 2011. In 2014, she released an EP entitled Lying in the Sun and also began creating music for the second season of the crime drama series True Detective. Working with songwriter and music producer T Bone Burnett, the two collaborated with singer-songwriter Rosanne Cash at Burnett's home in Los Angeles, California with two of the resulting tracks being included on Cash's 2018 album She Remembers Everything. After approving the musical tracks, series creator Nic Pizzolatto cast Lynn as a recurring character who performs the songs in a dive bar frequented by the main characters. Her 2016 album Resistor was reviewed in Rolling Stone.

Discography
 Have You Met Lera Lynn (2011)
 Lying in the Sun (2014)
 The Avenues (2014)
 True Detective: Music From the HBO Series Soundtrack (2015)
 Resistor (2016)
 Plays Well With Others (2018)
 On My Own (2020)
 Something More Than Love (2022)

References

External links
 leralynn.com (official website)
 Lera Lynn at Allmusic

Living people
American women country singers
American country singer-songwriters
University of Georgia alumni
Musicians from Houston
1984 births
Singer-songwriters from Texas
21st-century American singers
21st-century American women singers
Country musicians from Texas